"I'm in the Mood for Love" is a popular song published in 1935. The music was written by Jimmy McHugh, with the lyrics by Dorothy Fields. The song was introduced by Frances Langford in the movie Every Night at Eight released that year.

It became Langford's signature song. Bob Hope, who frequently worked with Langford entertaining troops in World War II, later wrote that her performance of the song was often a show-stopper.

History
Other popular recordings in 1935 were by  Little Jack Little, Louis Armstrong and Leo Reisman and his Orchestra with vocals by Frank Luther.
 
The song was in the 1936 Our Gang (Little Rascals) short film The Pinch Singer where it was performed by Darla Hood and Carl "Alfalfa" Switzer (on separate occasions). Switzer also performed the song in the 1936 film Palm Springs.

In a 1954 episode of The Spike Jones Show, Billy Barty sang it while impersonating Liberace, complete with toy piano.

In the 1963 Jerry Lewis film The Nutty Professor, it is one of the songs Buddy Love sings to try to win the affections of Stella (Stella Stevens).

Other recordings
 1935 Vera Lynn — one of her first recordings. Made for the Casani Club Orchestra.
 1944 Coleman Hawkins & The Trumpet Kings — with Teddy Wilson and Roy Eldridge. New York 31/01/1944
 1946 Billy Eckstine — this single release reached No. 12 in the Billboard charts.
 1946 The King Cole Trio — included in the album The King Cole Trio.
 1949 James Moody's saxophone solo on his recording of this song inspired the song "Moody's Mood for Love".
 1950 Charlie Parker — for the album Charlie Parker with Strings.
 1951 Erroll Garner — instrumental (earlier informal recording in 1944)
 1952 Eddie Fisher — for the album I'm in the Mood for Love.
 1952 Jo Stafford — included in the album As You Desire Me.
 1955 Joni James — for the album When I Fall in Love.
 1955 Julie London — for her album Julie Is Her Name.
 1956 Mae West — The Fabulous Mae West.
 1957 Fats Domino — Here Stands Fats Domino.
 1957 Rosemary Clooney — included in the album Ring Around Rosie.
 1958 Louis Prima & Keely Smith — a single release. Later included in compilations.
 1959 Brook Benton — It's Just a Matter of Time.
 1959 Pat Boone — for the album Tenderly.
 1960 Paul Anka — Swings for Young Lovers.
 1960 Johnny Mathis — for the album Johnny's Mood.
 1961 Brenda Lee — for the album Emotions.
 1961 The Chimes — reached No. 38 in the Billboard charts.
 1961 Shirley Bassey — included in her album Shirley
 1961 Caterina Valente — Italian cover Quando ti stringi a me included in her album Caterina
1962 Marty Robbins — included in his album Marty After Midnight. Later included in his 1974 album for I've Got a Woman's Love, as well as the 2004 compilation Love Songs. 
 1963 Alma Cogan — a single release. Later included in compilations.
 1963 Cliff Richard — for the EP Love Songs.
 1965 Lord Tanamo recorded a ska version of the song ("I'm in the Mood for Ska") for Ska Beat label. * Lord Tanamo's version reached number 58 on the UK Singles Chart in 1990 for three weeks.
 1965 Sam Cooke — for the album Shake.
 1978 Shirley Bassey — for her album Yesterdays.
 1988 Classic hip-hop artist Slick Rick sang a modified version of the first stanza in the song "Indian Girl (An Adult Story)" from his debut album The Great Adventures of Slick Rick. 
1995 Ava Cherry recorded a version in 1975 produced by David Bowie which was finally released on the album "People from Bad Homes" and credited to Avan Cherry and The Astronettes.
 1999 Bryan Ferry for the album As Time Goes By (Bryan Ferry album).
 1999 Hip-hop artist Prince Paul sampled the song as the basis for the track "Mood for Love" on his album A Prince Among Thieves, with Don Newkirk singing its original lyrics.
 2000 Jools Holland and His Rhythm & Blues Orchestra feat. Jamiroquai — performed live on Later... with Jools Holland as well as being released as a single as part of the soundtrack for the movie Kevin & Perry Go Large; a music video was released for the song in 2001; it paid tribute to the recently deceased Julie London, who had previously performed the song (albeit in a different arrangement).
 2003 Barbra Streisand — for The Movie Album.
 2003 Rod Stewart — included in his album As Time Goes By: The Great American Songbook, Volume II.
 2021 Billie Eilish — performed in the style of Julie London at the BBC Radio 1 Live Lounge.

References

1935 songs
1961 singles
Pop standards
Songs written for films
Songs with music by Jimmy McHugh
Songs with lyrics by Dorothy Fields
Barbra Streisand songs
Ella Fitzgerald songs
Jo Stafford songs
The Chimes songs
The Platters songs
Dorothy Squires songs